Mere Tokorahi Boynton is a New Zealand singer, producer, actor and dancer. She is best known for her role as Mavis in the film Once Were Warriors.

Early life and education 
Boynton identifies with Te Aitanga a Mahaki, Ngāti Oneone and Ngāi Tūhoe iwi. She grew up in Te Tairāwhiti. 

Boynton trained in singing at the Conservatorium of Music in Wellington.

Work 
Boynton played Mavis in the film Once Were Warriors.

Boynton sang Gareth Farr's Te Papa, for the opening of the Museum of New Zealand Te Papa Tongarewa. She toured New Zealand in Michael Parmenter's dance opera Jerusalem and was in a te reo Māori version of The Merchant of Venice, Te Tangata Whairawa o Weneti.

In 2019 Boynton appeared in the premiere of Witi Ihimaera's show Witi's Wahine at the Tairawhiti Arts Festival.

Boynton was appointed as Director Ngā Toi Māori for the New Zealand events organiser Tāwhiri in September 2020. Tāwhiri organises the New Zealand Festival of the Arts, Wellington Jazz Festival, and the Lexus Song Quest.

In July 2021, Boynton was a soloist for the premiere of Matariki, composed by Gareth Farr and for which Boynton and Ariana Tikao wrote the words. Matariki was performed by the NZSO  in Auckland and Wellington, and was conducted by Gemma New.

References 

Living people
Year of birth missing (living people)
21st-century New Zealand women singers
New Zealand actors
Te Aitanga-a-Māhaki people
Ngāi Tūhoe people
Ngāti Porou people
New Zealand dancers
New Zealand Māori women singers